The Mosley-Thompson Cirques are prominent steep-walled a cirques that indent the western part of Colwell Massif, Victoria Land, Antarctica. They were named by the Advisory Committee on Antarctic Names in 1994 after glaciologist Ellen Stone Mosley-Thompson of the Byrd Polar Research Center, Ohio State University, who for many years from 1974 onwards analyzed ice samples from Antarctica and conducted field research at the South Pole, at Siple Station, and at Plateau Remote Camp.

References

Cirques of Antarctica
Landforms of Victoria Land
Scott Coast